Martín de Zelaya y Oláriz or Martín de Celaya y Oláriz was a Roman Catholic prelate who served as Bishop of Santiago de Cuba (1645–1649).

Biography
Martín de Zelaya y Oláriz was born in Oñate, Spain.
In 1646, he was consecrated bishop. 
On 20 November 1645, he was appointed during the papacy of Pope Innocent X as Bishop of Santiago de Cuba.
In 1646, he was consecrated bishop. 
He served as Bishop of Santiago de Cuba until his resignation in 1649.

References

External links and additional sources
 (for Chronology of Bishops) 
 (for Chronology of Bishops) 

17th-century Roman Catholic bishops in Cuba
Bishops appointed by Pope Innocent X
Roman Catholic bishops of Santiago de Cuba